Cameron Erskine Thom (June 20, 1825 – February 2, 1915) was a lawyer, a legislator, a Confederate officer in the Civil War and the 16th mayor of Los Angeles, California, from 1882 to 1884.

Personal

Thom was born in Culpeper County, Virginia, or in Richmond, Virginia, on June 20, 1825, the son of John Thom, who had been an officer in the War of 1812 and for 30 years was a Virginia state senator. Cameron was educated in private schools in Virginia and was graduated from the University of Virginia, where he earned a law degree.

After university, Thom traveled west in a caravan of some 40 young men and arrived in Sacramento in 1849. He gathered gold on the South Fork of the American River, in Amador County, then settled in Sacramento to open a law office. Thom served in the Confederate Army during the Civil War. He was wounded at the Battle of Gettysburg and ended the war as a captain.

Thom was married twice, first in 1858 to Susan Henrietta Hathwell, and then, after Susan's death in 1862, to her sister, Belle Cameron Hathwell, in 1874. He had four children, Cameron DeHart, Charles Catesby, Erskine Pembroke and Belle (Mrs. Arthur Collins of London, England).

Thom died on February 2, 1915, at the age of 89. A funeral service in his home at 2070 West Adams Street attracted a "company of several hundred persons," including representatives of the Society of Colonial Wars, of which he was a founder and charter member. Interment was in Evergreen Cemetery, Los Angeles.

Vocation
Thom arrived in California in 1849 during the gold rush and after a few years of successful mining, he studied law in Sacramento.  In fall 1853 he moved to San Francisco, where he worked as a deputy agent for the United States Land Commission, and then to Los Angeles, where he had a similar job. Shortly after arriving, he was appointed Los Angeles County district attorney, and he later won the office in an election. He was also elected Los Angeles city attorney for the 1856–58 term.

In 1859–60 Thom was state senator from California's 1st State Senate district, and he was Los Angeles County district attorney from 1854 to 1857, from 1869 to 1873 and from 1877 to 1879.  He was mayor of Los Angeles from 1882 to 1884, and he was on the Board of Freeholders that framed the first city charter for L.A.

City of Glendale
The land case known as "The Great Partition" of 1871 resulted in the division of Rancho San Rafael into thirty-one sections which were given to twenty-eight different people including  for Thom.  The land belonging to Prudent Beaudry, Alfred Chapman, Andrew Glassell and Thom evolved into Glendale.  Thom, Harry J. Crow, and Thom's nephew, Erskine Mayo Ross, along with B. F. Patterson and B. T. Byram, were responsible for the creation of the city of Glendale in 1887.

References

1825 births
1915 deaths
Mayors of Los Angeles
History of Los Angeles
California state senators
Los Angeles City Attorneys
District attorneys in California
People of Virginia in the American Civil War
Burials at Evergreen Cemetery, Los Angeles
19th-century American politicians
People from West Adams, Los Angeles
19th-century American lawyers
People from Culpeper County, Virginia
University of Virginia alumni
Lawyers from Sacramento, California